Mary Henrietta Dering Curtois, known professionally as Dering Curtois, (1854–1928) was a British artist, known for painting genre scenes, landscapes and portraits.

Biography

Curtois was born at Branston in Lincolnshire and studied art at the Lincoln School of Art and also in London and in Paris at the Académie Julian. She exhibited at a number of London galleries including, between 1887 and 1902, at the New Gallery and also showed six works at the Royal Academy. Between 1887 and 1928 Curtois also exhibited works with the Society of Women Artists. 

Curtois lived at Washingborough Manor near Lincoln and in London, until later in life when she moved to Little Missenden in Buckinghamshire where she was an active member of the Buckinghamshire Art Society. Both the Usher Gallery in Lincoln and Canterbury Museums and Galleries hold examples of her work. Her sister, Ella Rose Curtois, was a sculptor.

References

External links

1854 births
1929 deaths
19th-century British painters
19th-century English women artists
20th-century British painters
20th-century English women artists
Académie Julian alumni
English women painters
People from North Kesteven District
Sibling artists